Mount Thornton is a mountain between Mount McCann and Mount Benkert in the east-central part of the Snow Nunataks, Palmer Land. Discovered and photographed by the United States Antarctic Service (USAS) 1939–41. Named by Advisory Committee on Antarctic Names (US-ACAN) for Captain Richard Thornton, commander of USNS Eltanin on Antarctic cruises, 1967–68.

Mountains of Palmer Land